Éloi Guillemette (December 1, 1911 – February 23, 1984) was a Canadian politician and a three-term Member of the Legislative Assembly of Quebec.

Background

He was born on December 1, 1911, near Saint-Célestin, Centre-du-Québec and became an agronomist.

Member of the legislature

Guillemette ran as a Union Nationale and won a seat to the Legislative Assembly of Quebec in the 1956 election in the provincial district of Frontenac.  He was re-elected in the 1960 and 1962 elections.

He did not run for re-election in the 1966 election.

Death

He died on February 23, 1984, in Sherbrooke, Quebec.

References

1911 births
1984 deaths
Union Nationale (Quebec) MNAs